Kalu (also Romanized as Kalū, Kaloo, and Kalow; also known as Chalow, Chelou, Chelow, Chelū, Chilov, and Chīlowv) is a village in Dizmar-e Markazi Rural District, Kharvana District, Varzaqan County, East Azerbaijan Province, Iran. At the 2006 census, its population was 77, in 24 families.

References 

Towns and villages in Varzaqan County